Eupithecia bestia is a moth in the family Geometridae. It is found in Pakistan (the Karakoram Mountains).

The wingspan is about 22 mm. The forewings are unicolorous grey, and the hindwings are also grey, but slightly lighter.

References

Moths described in 2008
bestia
Moths of Asia